Agustín Alejandro Módula (born 12 March 1993) is an Argentine professional footballer who plays as a central midfielder for Guadalajara.

Career
Módula made his Chacarita Juniors debut during the 2012–13 Primera B Metropolitana season, he played the final thirteen minutes as Chacarita won 3–4 away to Deportivo Morón. Twenty-seven appearances followed throughout his first three seasons in Primera B Metropolitana, including five in 2014 as the club won promotion. He featured twelve times in the 2015 Primera B Nacional, prior to leaving Chacarita on loan for the 2016 campaign to join Deportivo Español in the third tier. He played five times for them as they finished 17th, before returning to Chacarita for the forthcoming 2016–17 in Primera B Nacional.

In 2016–17, Módula scored the first goal of his career on 2 June 2017 against Almagro prior to receiving his first red card versus Los Andes over a month later. Weeks after that sending off, Chacarita secured promotion to the 2017–18 Argentine Primera División. On 3 September 2019, Módula was announced as a new signing of Spanish Tercera División side Guadalajara. His debut arrived on 7 September in a win away from home against Albacete B, as he replaced Lautaro Ruiz after sixty-one minutes.

Career statistics
.

References

External links

1993 births
Living people
Footballers from Buenos Aires
Argentine footballers
Association football midfielders
Argentine expatriate footballers
Expatriate footballers in Spain
Argentine expatriate sportspeople in Spain
Primera B Metropolitana players
Primera Nacional players
Argentine Primera División players
Tercera División players
Chacarita Juniors footballers
Deportivo Español footballers
CD Guadalajara (Spain) footballers